Attwater's pocket gopher (Geomys attwateri) is a species of rodent in the family Geomyidae. It is endemic to the Texas Coastal Bend in the southcentral United States.

This species was named in honor of English naturalist Henry Philemon Attwater.

References

Attwater's Pocket Gopher
Mammals of the United States
Mammals described in 1895